St Catherines; is a village, on the Cowal peninsula in Argyll and Bute, Scottish Highlands. It is located on the banks of Loch Fyne opposite Inveraray and is served by the A815 road.

The old Ferry Inn, in St. Catherines is on the buildings at risk register of Scotland.

The remains of St Catherine's Chapel and Burial Ground.  Now only foundations remain of the chapel.

Gallery

References

External links

St Catherines
Highlands and Islands of Scotland